Tylomelania towutensis is a species of freshwater snail with an operculum, an aquatic gastropod mollusk in the family Pachychilidae.

The specific name towutensis is according to the lake Towuti.

Distribution 
This species occurs in Malili lakes, Sulawesi, Indonesia. It occur in the single lake and the type locality is the lake Towuti.

Description 
The shell has 6-9 whorls.

The width of the shell is 20 mm. The height of the shell is 62 mm. The width of the aperture is 12 mm. The height of the aperture is 20 mm.

There are 6-7 concentric lines on the operculum.

References

External links 
 von Rintelen T. & Glaubrecht M. (2005). "Anatomy of an adaptive radiation: a unique reproductive strategy in the endemic freshwater gastropod Tylomelania (Cerithioidea: Pachychilidae) on Sulawesi, Indonesia and its biogeographical implications." Biological Journal of the Linnean Society 85: 513–542. .

towutensis
Gastropods described in 1897